Rose Kabagyeni is a Ugandan Agriculturalist by profession and politician who has been member of the Parliament of Uganda from 2016 to 2021.

She is also the current woman  Member of Parliament (MP) for the  Kisoro District, a position she has held since 2016

Background and education 
She was born  on  04-Aug-1974  Rose Kabagyeni attended the following tabulated education levels.

Work experience

References

Members of the Parliament of Uganda
Women members of the Parliament of Uganda
Living people
Year of birth missing (living people)